Idolishche Poganoye is a mythological monstrosity from  Russian bylinas (epic tales) and other  folklore; he personifies pagan forces invading the Russian lands.
The name literally means "pagan idol", with a Russian augmentative suffix "-ishche".

The major epic sources that involve Idolische are various variants of the bylina "Ilya Muromets and Idolishche Poganoye" ("Илья Муромец и Идолище Поганое"), which may also characterise Idolishche as "Tatarin" (the Tatar), in reference to the Tatar-Mongol yoke.

The 1956 fantasy-film  Ilya Muromets depicts Idolishche as a massive zeppelin-like man with a bleach-white face arriving on an elevated platform as part of the Tugar (pagan Mongol) forces and mocked as looking like "a fat ox" by one of the Russian characters.

References 

Russian folklore characters
Characters in Bylina